Leslie Clio (born 16 August 1986) is a German singer, songwriter, music video director and producer.

Career 
In 2008, Clio moved to Berlin. In 2013, she released her first album Gladys, a retro soul pop record which got her signed to Universal Music and charted at #11 in the German Albums Chart. The singles "I Couldn't Care Less" and "Told You So" became instant airplay hits and earned her a nomination for an "ECHO" Award in the category "Best Female Artist National". She played with Keane, Marlon Roudette, Phoenix and Joss Stone on tour. Following the success of her first album, Clio released her second record Eureka (Universal Music) in spring 2015, which charted at #13. The first single "My Heart Ain't That Broken" became another top 50 airplay song. In 2015, Clio appeared on Shuko's record For the Love of It (2015) with the song "Heatwave" featuring Talib Kweli. She became one of the five members of the German jury for the Eurovision Song Contest 2015 in Vienna. Her third record Purple was released on 17 May 2017, and the additional acoustic EP was released in October. In 2018 she appeared on the German TV Show Sing Meinen Song. A Purple Deluxe Edition was released in June 2018. In June 2019 she released Repeat, an EP with 6 cover songs. In 2020 she founded her own label House Of Clio. In 2021, she released the children's album HIGHFIVE! under the name KID CLIO and translated and sung the theme song for the Disney Princess 2021 campaign Ultimate Princess Celebration, originally sung by Brandy. Her fourth and self released studio album Brave New Woman was released on 4 February 2022. In the fall she was a finalist in the German edition of The Masked Singer.

Personal life 
Leslie is vegan and a Peta Activist

Discography

Albums

Singles

References

External links
Official website
 

21st-century German women singers
Singers from Berlin
Musicians from Hamburg
English-language singers from Germany
German women singer-songwriters
Vertigo Records artists
1986 births
Living people